Crossford may refer to:
Crossford, Dumfries and Galloway, Scotland
formerly served by Crossford railway station
Crossford, Fife, Scotland
Crossford, South Lanarkshire, Scotland